The 1936 Pittsburgh Americans season was their first season in existence. The team played in the American Football League would go on to post a 3-3-1 record overall, and a 3-2-1 league record.

Schedule

Game notes

Final standings

Final 1936 standings

References
Pro Football Archives: 1936 Pittsburgh Americans season

Pittsburgh Americans seasons
Pittsburgh